Olivier Roy may refer to:
Olivier Roy (ice hockey) (born 1991), Canadian ice hockey goaltender
Olivier Roy (professor) (born 1949), professor at the European University Institute in Florence